Die Hard is an American action film series that originated with Roderick Thorp's 1979 novel Nothing Lasts Forever. All five films revolve around the main character of John McClane, a New York City/Los Angeles police detective who continually finds himself in the middle of a crisis where he is the only hope against disaster. The films have grossed a combined $1.4 billion worldwide.

Films

Die Hard (1988)
 
The first film takes place at Nakatomi Plaza in Los Angeles. It begins on Christmas Eve when McClane (Bruce Willis) comes to reunite with separated wife Holly (Bonnie Bedelia) in Los Angeles at her company's Christmas party. Holly, who now has her own career,   lives with their two children, and uses her maiden name.

At the fictional Nakatomi Plaza (portrayed by Fox Plaza), East German terrorists break in and take the celebrants hostage. McClane escapes detection and hides throughout the building. He kills off the gang and learns their real plan, to steal $640 million in bearer bonds from the building's vault. In the finale, McClane shoots the terrorist leader, Hans Gruber (Alan Rickman), out of the window to fall thirty stories.

It was released on July 15, 1988, to positive reviews and grossed $140.8 million worldwide.

Die Hard 2 (1990)

The second film takes place two years after the first, again on Christmas Eve of 1989. In Washington, D.C., McClane waits for his wife at Washington Dulles International Airport. Mercenaries led by former U.S. Army Special Forces Colonel Stuart (William Sadler) take over the airport communication systems, stranding planes in the air, including the one with McClane's wife. Colonel Stuart wants to free a captured Latin American dictator (Franco Nero) en route to the airport. McClane discovers the plan, including a conspiracy between Stuart and an Army counter-terrorist unit sent to stop him. He foils their plans and provides a visual landing signal for the circling aircraft by exploding the villains' getaway plane.

It was released on July 4, 1990, to positive reviews and grossed $240 million worldwide.

Die Hard with a Vengeance (1995)

In the third film, McClane is back in New York City, separated from his wife, suspended from the police force, and a borderline alcoholic. A terrorist known only as "Simon" (Jeremy Irons) threatens to blow up various locations in the city unless McClane will play his twisted version of Simon Says, riddles and challenges.

Zeus Carver (Samuel L. Jackson), a shopkeeper from Harlem, saves McClane after the first challenge, and reluctantly continues to help. The FBI reveal Simon is the brother of Hans Gruber, killed in the first film. McClane learns revenge is a cover story for robbing the New York Federal Reserve. McClane tracks Simon to the Canada–US border. McClane kills Simon by shooting at a power line above Simon's helicopter.

It was released on May 19, 1995, to mixed reviews and grossed $366.1 million worldwide.

Live Free or Die Hard (2007)
 
The fourth film, which was released as Die Hard 4.0 outside North America, takes place on Independence Day, over a decade after Die Hard with a Vengeance. McClane is divorced,  and estranged from his daughter Lucy (Mary Elizabeth Winstead). Cyber-terrorists hack into computers at the FBI, who had sent McClane to bring in computer hacker Matthew "Matt" Farrell (Justin Long) for questioning. Assassins hired by terrorist mastermind Thomas Gabriel (Timothy Olyphant) attempt to kill McClane and Farrell. Farrell tells McClane that the terrorists are actually in the middle of a "fire sale" — a crippling cyber-warfare attack on the national infrastructure: power, public utilities, traffic, and other computer-controlled systems. Although the terrorists capture Lucy and Farrell, McClane foils the criminals and saves the hostages.

It was released June 27, 2007 to positive reviews and grossed $383.5 million worldwide.

A Good Day to Die Hard (2013)

The fifth film is set a few years later, mostly in Moscow, Russia and Chernobyl (Pripyat), Ukraine. McClane finds out that his estranged son John "Jack" McClane, Jr. (Jai Courtney) was arrested in Moscow for murder. When he arrives at the Moscow courthouse for Jack, Russian terrorists bomb the building and Jack escapes with imprisoned ex-billionaire Yuri Komarov (Sebastian Koch). In an intense car chase, McClane pursues and saves the pair. Jack, unhappy at the unexpected arrival, reluctantly picks up his father. When they stop at a CIA safe house in Moscow, McClane learns Jack is a deep-cover CIA operative trying to get close to Komarov for his file that incriminates corrupt, high-ranking Russian official Viktor Chagarin (Sergei Kolesnikov). Chagarin's henchmen, led by his main enforcer Alik (Radivoje Bukvic), attack the safe house. McClane holds them off, and escapes with Jack and Komarov. They retrieve a key for the file in Chernobyl, and meet Komarov's daughter Irina (Yuliya Snigir). Irina betrays them to Alik. The McClanes escape, without Komarov. Irina, always on the side of her father Komarov, tries to save him. McClane goes after Irina, while Jack chases her father. Jack throws Komarov off of the roof; he falls on the rotors of the helicopter and gets shredded to bits.

It was released on February 14, 2013, to negative reviews and grossed $304.7 million worldwide.

Future
When the production was formally announced for the fifth film in the series, Bruce Willis expressed his desire to retire the John McClane character in a sixth and final film, explicitly calling for a 'fleshed out' conclusion.

Come 2013, Fox Studios began looking into developing the next installment. The studio took story pitches for a so-called "Die Hardest", including those from the public, at least one of which would have brought the action to Japan. A crossover with popular television program, 24, with Die Hard characters had been previously considered, but contract negotiations with Kiefer Sutherland soured and no pilot was made; Die Hard being re-formulated as a gaiden featuring Jack Bauer called "Die Hard 24/7" was optioned and became A Good Day to Die Hard. The Studio then chose to reincarnate 24 in limited edition as 24: Live Another Day (homage to Live Free or Die Hard), which premiered in May 2014 and ended that July. By 2015, Live Free or Die Hard director Len Wiseman's self-penned prequel/sequel origin story idea called John McClane gained traction.

Writer Evan Katz pitched a follow-up to Live Another Day called 24: Legacy that was greenlit in 2015. The show aired from February through April 2017 and was soon cancelled (not renewed) in June. Following this model, a deal had been made with Lorenzo di Bonaventura to produce another, similar television programme that revolved around the concept of real-time narration, but for twelve hours instead of twenty-four since Die Hard stories happen over that time frame, saying, "We want you to get invested in John McClane more than ever before". That summer, Wiseman was in negotiations to direct a standalone mini-series (12 episodes) tentatively titled, "DIE HARD: Year One", based around the BOOM! Studios graphic novel of the same name. Its plot - rumored to borrow heavily from said comic book issues - follows John McClane as a beat cop in New York City early in his career as narrated by Bruce Willis in the present-day.  Wiseman publicly floated that he was casting for a young version of John McClane in September. Six months later, the studio enlisted duo Chad Hayes and Carey W. Hayes to re-write the screenplay after Bruce Willis refused to endorse the previous edition and its actor.

In July 2018, di Bonaventura submitted an updated treatment titled McClane, further confirming that the storyline was similar in stature to The Godfather Part 2: featuring elements of McClane's and Holly's characters in the 1970s, intermixed with their present-day counterparts. The following month, Wiseman stated that pre-production on the new film should start "...fairly soon, no dates" once the script has been completed. Tobey Maguire (son in-law of then-NBCUniversal Chairman Ronald Meyer) joined the production team in late Summer. By December, di Bonaventura handed in yet another draft, this time without input from Willis. Production designer Carol Uraneck, who was hired that September, later left the project by the close of the year. Between February and April 2019, the production team made revisions to the writing, but insinuated that the project, though supposedly moving forward, is on the studio's backburner.  It has been hinted that Samuel L. Jackson could reprise his role as Zeus. Actress Mary Elizabeth Winstead said that she would be interested in returning as Lucy Gennero-McClane, but later intimated doubt that, due to scheduling, the film would ever get made.

The acquisition of 20th Century Fox by Disney resulted in a production hiatus in August 2019. Wiseman was then dealt to Lionsgate to direct pictures in the John Wick universe. di Bonaventura stated in a July 2021 interview that the McClane project is "not happening" as a further consequence. Die Hard was removed from the Fox imprint indefinitely. In lieu of companies-wide reorganization, the media giants (Disney, Comcast) are said to be rebooting the property for streaming on Hulu or Netflix.

Willis had taken roles that featured the "Die Hard scenario" or implied its namefellow in a number of direct-to-video movies since the release of DH5 (filmography). After confirmation of a DH6 cancellation and the wrap of production on the film Detective Knight: Rogue, Willis's family announced that he had been diagnosed with aphasia and paused his career. In July 2022, he was videographed on the lot at Fox headquarters, the very same location of the set of DH1, to mark that film's anniversary. This footage was shared by his wife on her social media. It was announced on February 16, 2023, that Willis had been diagnosed with frontotemporal dementia, but still hoping to do more acting.

Cast and crew

Cast

Crew

Production

Source material
Die Hard is adapted from the 1979 novel Nothing Lasts Forever by Roderick Thorp.

Die Hard 2 was adapted from the 1987 novel 58 Minutes by Walter Wager.

Die Hard with a Vengeance was adapted from a script called Simon Says by Jonathan Hensleigh, which was also briefly considered to become the script for Lethal Weapon 4. The hook in Hensleigh's screenplay that captured the attention of director John McTiernan was the idea of a man being targeted for revenge by someone whose life he had unwittingly destroyed. Once the Simon character became the brother of Hans Gruber and the backstory was established, the project fully came together. It was novelized by Deborah Chiel.

Live Free or Die Hard was based on the 1997 article "A Farewell to Arms" written for Wired magazine by John Carlin. It also drew on a script 20th Century Fox owned called "WW3.com", which dealt with a massive cyberterrorism attack against the U.S. and which was nearly put into production in 2001 but ultimately abandoned because several elements in the story too closely resembled the September 11 attacks.

A Good Day to Die Hard was the only film in the series to come from an original screenplay, and not be based upon any prior works. The original screenplay was penned by Skip Woods.

Reception

Box office performance

Critical and public response
Although the first Die Hard has been credited as one of the greatest action movies of all time, critical reaction to its sequels has varied.

The original Die Hard received substantial praise. Pete Croatto of FilmCritic.com called the film "a perfect action movie in every detail, the kind of movie that makes your summer memorable". James Berardinelli wrote that the film "represents the class of modern action pictures and the standard by which they must be judged". Critic Desson Howe wrote that "Willis has found the perfect vehicle to careen wildly onto the crowded L.A. freeway of Lethal Weapons and Beverly Hills Cops". Willis was also called "perfect as the wisecracking John McClane" and "an excellent casting choice as a sardonic action hero". Alan Rickman's portrayal of villain Hans Gruber was described as "marvelous" and "a career-making performance". Gruber also ranked 46 on the villain side of AFI's 100 Years...100 Heroes and Villains. In 2007, Entertainment Weekly ranked Die Hard the greatest action film of all time.

The first sequel, Die Hard 2, received positive reviews, although not as many as the original.  Despite only giving the original film two stars, critic Roger Ebert gave this film three and a half stars and called it "terrific entertainment". James Berardinelli called the film "somewhat-muddled but still entertaining". Peter Travers wrote that "however impressively made, Die Hard 2 begins to wear thin".

The third film, Die Hard with a Vengeance, received mixed reviews. Owen Gleiberman of Entertainment Weekly stated that while "McTiernan stages individual sequences with great finesse... they don't add up to a taut, dread-ridden whole". James Berardinelli thought that the explosions and fights were "filmed with consummate skill, and were thrilling in their own right". Samuel L. Jackson also received praise for his role in the film. Desson Howe of The Washington Post thought that "the best thing about the movie was the relationship between McClane and Zeus," saying that Jackson was "almost as good as he was in Pulp Fiction".

The fourth film, Live Free or Die Hard, received highly positive reviews. Mick LaSalle of the San Francisco Chronicle claimed that the film "is the best in the series, an invigorating return to the style of blockbuster that dominated summers back in the early 1990s".  USA Today film critic Claudia Puig said that the film "delivers when it comes to kick-butt, action-packed mayhem," but "as a convincing techno-thriller, it doesn't really work".

The fifth film, A Good Day to Die Hard, received mostly negative reviews from critics. Critics lambasted the installment for "[entering] generic action movie territory", as written by reviewer James Bernardinelli, with a "cliched [and] uninspired script". Peter Rainer of the Christian Science Monitor wrote, "John's appeal was always his ordinariness, but director John Moore has him surviving more explosions than Wile E. Coyote, and with hardly a scratch." A. O. Scott of The New York Times also commented that the series has taken a downfall with the movie, saying "Everything that made the first "Die Hard" memorable—the nuances of character, the political subtext, the cowboy wit—has been dumbed down or scrubbed away entirely." Willis has however, been cited as the film's redeeming quality, with Chris Vognar of the Dallas Morning News saying "Willis' presence at least provides undercurrents of easy jocularity."

In CinemaScore polls conducted during the opening weekend, movie audiences gave the series the grades listed below on an A+ to F scale.

Other media

Comics
Die Hard: Year One
BOOM! Studios published an ongoing Die Hard comic series that serves as a prequel to the first movie, titled Die Hard: Year One. Its story is set in 1976 and follows John McClane as a rookie cop in the NYPD, and is scripted by Howard Chaykin. The first issue of Die Hard: Year One was released on September 30, 2009. Eight issues have been released, with the eighth released on April 12, 2010.

The official description read:

A Die Hard Christmas
The official description read:

A Million Ways to Die Hard
In 2018, Insight Comics released the graphic novel A Million Ways to Die Hard. It was scripted by writer Frank Tieri and artist Mark Texeira.

The official description read:

Video games
A number of video games based on the successful movie franchise Die Hard have been released over the years, ranging from beat 'em ups to first-person shooters. While some of the games are based directly on the movies, a few further detail the adventures of John McClane:

 Die Hard for Nintendo Entertainment System, MS-DOS, Commodore 64 and PC Engine.
 Die Hard 2: Die Harder for MS-DOS, Commodore 64, Commodore Amiga and Atari ST.
 Die Hard Arcade (Dynamite Deka in Japan) for Arcade, Sega Saturn and PlayStation 2.
 Dynamite Cop and Asian Dynamite, sequels to Dynamite Deka.
 Die Hard Trilogy for PC, PlayStation, and Saturn.
 Die Hard Trilogy 2: Viva Las Vegas for PC and PlayStation.
 Die Hard 64 (unreleased) for the Nintendo 64. This game was never completed or even officially announced, but news of its existence was leaked to the press. Early in development its platform was switched to the GameCube, and it evolved into Die Hard: Vendetta.
 Die Hard: Nakatomi Plaza for PC.
 Die Hard: Vendetta for GameCube, Xbox, and PlayStation 2.
 Die Hard for Java phones, developed by Mobile Scope.
 Die Hard 4.0: The Mobile Game for mobile phones. Developed by Gameloft, mostly a re-skin of their earlier Mission Impossible III.
 Die Hard for iOS and Android.
 A Good Day to Die Hard for Java and Android devices.

Commercial
DieHard is Back
In October 2020, Advance Auto Parts released the two-minute commercial short film DieHard is Back for the company's DieHard car-battery brand, with Bruce Willis, De'voreaux White and Clarence Gilyard Jr. reprising their roles as John McClane, Argyle, and Theo, respectively, from the first film. The narrative follows Theo, the former tech specialist of Hans Gruber, and others seeking to kill McClane as he tries to get a new car battery and replace the dead one in his car, with limousine-driver Argyle helping him along the way.

Other appearances
 The character John McClane also appears in the 1993 film Loaded Weapon 1, which is also portrayed by Bruce Willis, in a comical cameo appearance.
 The Cleveland Show features an episode called "Die Semi-Hard" parodying the first film; in another episode titled "Our Gang", Cleveland recites a speech referencing a scene in the first Die Hard and another delinquent teen asks him "Are you the black guy in Die Hard".
 Family Guy has parodied and referenced the movie in several episodes; in "Meet the Quagmires", Peter tells Brian "Now I know what a TV dinner feels like", the same quote that McClane said while crawling through the air vent in the first film. In "Brian's Got a Brand New Bag", Brian impresses his girlfriend Rita by saying he was one of the cops in the first film. In "Roasted Guy", Peter shows a cutaway gag parodying the first film killing someone he accused of stealing his lunch. In "Shanksgiving" while the four main characters were in prison, Joe joins a prison gang called the "not cops" and said they were not watching Die Hard and commenting on the plot failings. In "Christmas is Coming" the School Choir sings a song about Die Hard in the tune of Silent Night where they sang: "Die Hard, Die Hard/ John McClane and his wife, Yippie-ki-yay Mother Fucker/Yippie-ki-yay Mother Fucker".
 Bruce Willis appeared in the 2019 film The Lego Movie 2: The Second Part in which he is crawling through an air vent in a reference to his character from the first Die Hard film.
 Call of Duty Warzone and Call of Duty: Black Ops Cold War feature John McClane character bundled with John Rambo as a playable DLC.

See also
 "Die Hard" phrase

References

Mass media franchises introduced in 1979
Film series introduced in 1988
 
20th Century Studios franchises
Films about terrorism in the United States
Action film series
Thriller film series
American film series
1980s English-language films
1990s English-language films
2000s English-language films
2010s English-language films